Edward James Temko (born November 1952) is an American journalist and newspaper editor who has worked much of his life in London in the United Kingdom. He has also been based in cities such as Lisbon, Brussels, Beirut, Moscow, Jerusalem, and Johannesburg. His articles appeared mainly in The Observer newspaper and focused on political and social issues. He previously wrote for The Guardian and was, until 2005, editor of the Jewish Chronicle. He is a correspondent for The Christian Science Monitor. Temko is a regular panelist on the BBC World programme Dateline London and BBC TV's Question Time. Temko has a regular column for the Monitor called "Patterns" based on Joseph C. Harsch's "Patterns of Diplomacy" column, in which Temko tracks trends in human connection.

Personal life
Temko was born into a Jewish family in Washington, D.C. but currently resides with his family in London.

References

1952 births
Living people
American male journalists
British radio personalities
The Guardian journalists
BBC people
The Observer people
The Christian Science Monitor people
American expatriates in the United Kingdom
American Zionists
Jewish American journalists
21st-century American Jews